Jacquiniella (tufted orchid) is a genus of flowering plants from the orchid family, Orchidaceae. It is native to Mexico, Central America, the West Indies, and South America.

The diploid chromosome number of one species, J. globosa, has been determined as 2n = 38.

Species
Kew accepts (as of May 2014) twelve species of Jacquiniella:

 Jacquiniella aporophylla (L.O.Williams) Dressler
 Jacquiniella cernua (Lindl.) Dressler
 Jacquiniella cobanensis (Ames & Schltr.)
 Jacquiniella colombiana Schltr.
 Jacquiniella equitantifolia (Ames) Dressler
 Jacquiniella gigantea Dressler
 Jacquiniella globosa (Jacq.) Schltr.
 Jacquiniella leucomelana (Rchb.f.) Schltr.
 Jacquiniella pedunculata Dressler
 Jacquiniella standleyi (Ames) Dressler
 Jacquiniella steyermarkii Carnevali & Dressler
 Jacquiniella teretifolia (Sw.) Britton & P. Wilson

See also
List of Orchidaceae genera

References

  (2006) Epidendroideae (Part One). Genera Orchidacearum 4: 262 ff. Oxford University Press.
  2005. Handbuch der Orchideen-Namen. Dictionary of Orchid Names. Dizionario dei nomi delle orchidee. Ulmer, Stuttgart

External links

Laeliinae genera
Laeliinae